Arnfinn Vik (20 May 1901 – 13 September 1990) was a Norwegian politician who served as Mayor of Oslo.

He was born at Drammen in Buskerud, Norway. He participated in the Left Communist Youth League's military strike action of 1924. He was convicted for assisting in this crime and sentenced to 4 months of prison. He was secretary of the Oslo Labour Party in 1936 and was a member of the Oslo City Council  from 1938.

He was a central resistance member during the occupation of Norway by Nazi Germany (1940-1945) and served as a leader of the Norwegian resistance  group, Hjemmefrontens Ledelse. After the end of World War II, he served as mayor of Oslo from 1945 to 1947. He was later director of the Oslo housing authority (Boligforvaltning).

References

Other sources
 

1901 births
1990 deaths
Politicians from Drammen
Norwegian prisoners and detainees
Prisoners and detainees of Norway
Norwegian resistance members
Labour Party (Norway) politicians
Mayors of Oslo